Müslüm Aydoğan (born 12 April 1989) is a Turkish footballer who plays as a centre-back for Yatağanspor.

References

External links

Turkish footballers
1989 births
Living people
People from Konak
TFF First League players
TFF Second League players
İstanbulspor footballers
Darıca Gençlerbirliği footballers
Bandırmaspor footballers
Kırklarelispor footballers
Kastamonuspor footballers
24 Erzincanspor footballers
Turkey youth international footballers
Association football central defenders